Herbert Howard Crawford (March 10, 1878 – January 27, 1946) was a provincial level politician from Alberta, Canada. He was born in Brampton, Ontario.

Biography
Crawford attempted a run at Edmonton municipal politics running for the position of Public School Trustee in the December 1912 Edmonton Municipal Election. He was unsuccessful in his bid to win a seat finishing 6th out of 7 candidates.

Less than a year later in the 1913 Alberta general election Crawford ran in the new Edmonton South against former premier Alexander Cameron Rutherford. Crawford defeated Rutherford by a substantial plurality that was not expected.

He would run for a second term in office in the 1917 Alberta general election. Crawford increased his margin of victory to win Edmonton South by a comfortable majority.

Edmonton South would be abolished in the 1921 Alberta general election as the 3 Edmonton ridings would be amalgamated into a single constituency with 5 seats electing members under a block vote. Crawford would go down to defeat finishing 9th out of the field of 26 candidates. He would attempt to re-gain a seat in the 1926 Alberta general election but again was substantially defeated under the new Single Transferable Vote system.

He died at his home in Edmonton on January 27, 1946.

References

External links
Alberta Legislature Membership Listing

1946 deaths
1878 births
Politicians from Brampton
Progressive Conservative Association of Alberta MLAs